Torodora biovalata is a moth in the family Lecithoceridae. It was described by Deepak Wadhawan and Virinder Kumar Walia in 2007. It is found in Rajasthan, India.

References

Moths described in 2007
Torodora